Bliss is a super-yacht launched on 5 May 2014 at the Palmer Johnson shipyard in Sturgeon Bay and delivered the next year. The interior and exterior design of Bliss were done by Nuvolari & Lenard. She is currently available for sale. 

Bliss has one sistership named DB9. A second sistership named Sanam, built in Florida, was delivered in July 2016.

Design 
Both the materials of the hull and the superstructure are made out of Aluminium with teak laid decks. The yacht is Lloyd's registered, issued by Cayman Islands.

Engines 
The main engines are two MTU 16V 4000 M93L .

See also
 DB9
 Luxury yacht
 List of motor yachts by length
 List of yachts built by Palmer Johnson

References 

2014 ships
Motor yachts
Ships built in the United States
Ships built in Sturgeon Bay, Wisconsin